Jonathan Oppenheim is a professor of physics at University College London. He is an expert in quantum information theory and quantum gravity. 

Oppenheim proved the Third law of thermodynamics (first conjectured by Walther Nernst in 1912) with Lluis Masanes.

Together with Michał Horodecki and Andreas Winter, he discovered quantum state-merging and used this
primitive to show that quantum information could be negative . More recently he and collaborators have developed a resource theory for thermodynamics on the nano and quantum scale. 

His Ph.D. under Bill Unruh at the University of British Columbia was on Quantum time.  In 2004 he was a postdoctoral researcher under Jacob Bekenstein and a Royal Society University Fellow in Cambridge before moving to University College London.

Edible ballot society 
As a student, Oppenheim was involved in the Edible Ballot Society which satirically advanced eating ballots to highlight the democracy gap in electoral politics. He was arrested at the 1997 APEC protests on University of British Columbia campus. He withdrew from the Commission for Public Complaints Against the RCMP following the refusal of the Prime Minister to testify.
His group was responsible for smuggling a siege catapult into the medieval city of Quebec during the Summit of Americas, 2001.  It was used to lob teddy bears.

Papers
Partial Quantum Information, Nature 436:673-676 (2005)

Implementing a Quantum Computation by Free Falling, Science 311:1106-1107 (2006)

The Uncertainty Principle Determines the Nonlocality of Quantum Mechanics, Science 330:1072-1074 (2010)

Horodecki, Michał, and Jonathan Oppenheim. "Fundamental limitations for quantum and nanoscale thermodynamics." Nature Communications 4 (2013).

The second laws of quantum thermodynamics. Proceedings of the National Academy of Sciences, 112(11), pp. 3275-3279 (2015)

A general derivation and quantification of the third law of thermodynamics, Nature Communications 8, 14538 (2017)

References

External links
Jonathan Oppenheim's Homepage 
Partial Quantum Information
Negative Information
Universe’s Quantum Weirdness Limits Its Weirdness

Living people
Year of birth missing (living people)
Quantum physicists
University of British Columbia alumni